Daisy Lewis (born 31 December 1984) is a British actress, writer, director and producer.

Early life
Lewis was educated at Port Regis School in Shaftesbury, Dorset, followed by DLD College in London. She then attended King's College London, where she studied English literature. Before attending university, she wrote for The Sunday Telegraph and The Art Newspaper. She was also a member of the National Youth Theatre.

Career

Stage
Lewis started her career at the Royal Court Theatre in the Joe Hill-Gibbins production of The Good Family. She then subsequently performed in Caryl Churchill's Seven Jewish Children and The Westbridge for the Royal Court and worked at The Young Vic, the Hampstead Theatre, the Sheffield Crucible, and the Soho Theatre.

Screen
Lewis' television career began with appearances in After You've Gone, the "Gridlock" episode of Doctor Who, Lewis, From Time to Time, and Pusher. She then joined Downton Abbey as local schoolteacher Miss Sarah Bunting and also played opposite Michael Gambon and Lindsay Duncan in Churchill's Secret.

Filmography

References

External links

1984 births
Living people
National Youth Theatre members